Thyrocopa keliae is a species of moth in the genus Thyrocopa. It is endemic to Molokai in the Hawaiian Islands.

References

Thyrocopa
Endemic moths of Hawaii
Moths described in 2015